Saša Ćirić or Saša Ḱiriḱ (born 11 January 1968) is a retired Macedonian football player.

Club career 
Ćirić started his career at Sloga Umin Dol. Via Metalurg Skopje he moved to Pelister. From the Bulgarian side CSKA Sofia (for which he played in 1994) he signed for FK Vardar again and went to FC Aarau. German Bundesliga side 1. FC Nürnberg bought him in 1997 for a fee of one million Swiss francs.

In 1999, Tennis Borussia Berlin signed him for four million Marks. Although Ćirić wanted to stay Nürnberg had to sell him after being relegated for financial reasons. In 2000, he signed at Eintracht Frankfurt.

In 2003, Ćirić joined The Club once again and retired in 2006 at Offenbacher Kickers.

International career 
He made his senior debut for Macedonia in an April 1995 friendly match against Bulgaria and has earned a total of 26 caps, scoring 8 goals. His final international was an April 2004 friendly match against Croatia.

Personal life
After retiring as a player, he became chairman of Macedonian second tier team FK Cementarnica 55.

References

External links 
 Saša Ćirić at eintracht-archiv.de 
 
  Saša Ćirić at MacedonianFootball.com
 

1968 births
Living people
Sportspeople from Kumanovo
Macedonian people of Serbian descent
Association football forwards
Yugoslav footballers
Macedonian footballers
North Macedonia international footballers
FK Metalurg Skopje players
FK Pelister players
FK Vardar players
PFC CSKA Sofia players
FC Aarau players
1. FC Nürnberg players
Tennis Borussia Berlin players
Eintracht Frankfurt players
Kickers Offenbach players
Yugoslav Second League players
Yugoslav First League players
Macedonian First Football League players
First Professional Football League (Bulgaria) players
Swiss Super League players
2. Bundesliga players
Bundesliga players
Regionalliga players
Macedonian expatriate footballers
Expatriate footballers in Bulgaria
Macedonian expatriate sportspeople in Bulgaria
Expatriate footballers in Switzerland
Macedonian expatriate sportspeople in Switzerland
Expatriate footballers in Germany
Macedonian expatriate sportspeople in Germany